Cannonball Express is a 1932 American action film directed by Wallace Fox and starring Rex Lease, Tom Moore and Lucile Browne.

Cast
 Rex Lease as Ned Logan
 Tom Moore as John Logan
 Lucile Browne as Sally
 Leon Ames as Jack Logan 
 Ruth Renick as Mary Logan

References

Bibliography
 Langman, Larry & Finn, Daniel. A Guide to American Crime Films of the Thirties. Greenwood Press, 1995.

External links
 

1932 films
1930s action films
American action films
Films directed by Wallace Fox
American black-and-white films
1930s English-language films
1930s American films